Belcastro is an Italian surname. Notable people with the surname include:

 James Belcastro (1895–1945), American mobster
 Lisa Belcastro (born 1988), American politician
 Luca Belcastro (born 1964), Italian classical composer
 Marie Belcastro (1920–2015), American murder victim
 Pete Belcastro, American television and radio personality
 Sarah-Marie Belcastro (born 1970), American mathematician known for mathematical knitting

Italian-language surnames